Ryan Taylor (born 2 March 1980, in Palmerston North) is a New Zealand rifle shooter. He competed in the 50 m rifle prone event at the 2012 Summer Olympics, where he placed 25th.

References

1980 births
Living people
New Zealand male sport shooters
Olympic shooters of New Zealand
Shooters at the 2004 Summer Olympics
Shooters at the 2012 Summer Olympics
Sportspeople from Palmerston North
Shooters at the 2016 Summer Olympics
Shooters at the 2006 Commonwealth Games
Shooters at the 2010 Commonwealth Games
Shooters at the 2014 Commonwealth Games
Shooters at the 2018 Commonwealth Games
Commonwealth Games competitors for New Zealand